Charles Cadogan may refer to:

 Charles Cadogan, 2nd Baron Cadogan (1685–1776), British peer and Member of Parliament for Reading
 Charles Cadogan, 1st Earl Cadogan (1728–1807), British peer and Whig politician
 Charles Cadogan, 2nd Earl Cadogan (1749–1832), British nobleman, styled Viscount Chelsea from 1800 to 1807
 Charles Cadogan, 8th Earl Cadogan (born 1937), British peer, landowner and philanthropist